Dresslerothamnus is a genus of flowering plants in the daisy family.

 Species
 Dresslerothamnus angustiradiatus (T.M.Barkley) H.Rob. - Panamá
 Dresslerothamnus gentryi H.Rob. - Colombia
 Dresslerothamnus peperomioides H.Rob. - Panamá
 Dresslerothamnus schizotrichus (Greenm.) C.Jeffrey - Costa Rica

References

Senecioneae
Asteraceae genera